The 2021 Oeiras Ladies Open was a professional women's tennis tournament played on outdoor clay courts. It was the first edition of the tournament which was part of the 2021 ITF Women's World Tennis Tour. It took place in Oeiras, Portugal between 12 and 18 April 2021.

Singles main-draw entrants

Seeds

 1 Rankings are as of 5 April 2021.

Other entrants
The following players received wildcards into the singles main draw:
  Beatriz Haddad Maia
  Elizabet Hamaliy
  Francisca Jorge
  Inês Murta
  Ana Filipa Santos

The following player received entry using a protected ranking:
  Alexandra Dulgheru

The following player received entry using a junior exempt:
  Victoria Jiménez Kasintseva

The following player received entry using as a special exempt:
  Lucia Bronzetti

The following players received entry from the qualifying draw:
  Federica Di Sarra
  Sina Herrmann
  Jang Su-jeong
  Suzan Lamens
  Diane Parry
  Olga Sáez Larra
  Katie Volynets
  Stephanie Wagner

The following player received entry as a lucky loser: 
  Marina Bassols Ribera

Champions

Singles

 Polona Hercog def.  Clara Burel, walkover

Doubles

 Lidziya Marozava /  Andreea Mitu def.  Marina Melnikova /  Conny Perrin, 3–6, 6–4, [10–3]

References

External links
 2021 Oeiras Ladies Open at ITFtennis.com

2021 ITF Women's World Tennis Tour
2021 in Portuguese tennis
April 2021 sports events in Portugal